Raymond E. Bright (April 24, 1923 – June 24, 2008) was an American football player and coach. He served as the head football coach at the University of Central Arkansas in Conway, Arkansas from 1965 to 1971, compiling a record of 33–30–3. Bright died in 2008.

Head coaching record

College

References

External links
 

1923 births
2008 deaths
Central Arkansas Bears football coaches
Central Arkansas Bears football players
High school football coaches in Arkansas
People from Hope, Arkansas